Alberto Cobrea (born 1 November 1990) is a Romanian professional footballer who plays as a goalkeeper for FC U Craiova 1948.

References

External links

1990 births
Living people
Romanian footballers
Association football goalkeepers
Liga I players
Liga II players
CS Mioveni players
CS Concordia Chiajna players
FC Petrolul Ploiești players
FC Dinamo București players
FC Botoșani players
FC Politehnica Iași (2010) players
CSM Reșița players
FC U Craiova 1948 players